Death Cab for Cutie has released ten studio albums, five extended plays (EPs), a demo tape, a digital album, one live album, thirty-two singles (including one as featured artist), nine music videos, and two DVDs. Death Cab for Cutie is an American indie rock group from Bellingham, Washington and was formed in 1997 by Ben Gibbard as a side project from Pinwheel. After releasing a demo tape, he added guitarist Chris Walla, bassist Nick Harmer, and drummer Nathan Good to the band. Death Cab signed to Barsuk Records and released four extended plays (EPs) and four studio albums through the label. The fourth album, Transatlanticism, reached number 97 on the Billboard 200 and was eventually certified gold in the United States. The group also issued nine singles and a demo tape through Barsuk.

In 2004, the band signed with Atlantic Records, a subsidiary of the Warner Music Group. Their first release on the label, Plans, earned a platinum certification and charted at number four in the US. The single "Soul Meets Body" was the band's first to chart on the Billboard Hot 100. Death Cab for Cutie topped the US and Canadian album charts with Narrow Stairs (2008), with help from the Hot 100 single "I Will Possess Your Heart". Both Plans and Narrow Stairs received critical praise and were nominated for the Grammy Award for Best Alternative Music Album.  Other projects with Atlantic include a downloadable digital album, two DVDs, and five singles.
 
In 2013, a limited edition vinyl boxed set called The Barsuk Years was released on the Artist in Residence label. The 7-LP set, which includes all the band's early works, was produced in a limited run of 1500 units, each individually numbered and signed by the band.

This list does not include material that members of Death Cab for Cutie recorded with The Postal Service, ¡All-Time Quarterback! or other side projects.

Albums

Studio albums

Digital albums

Live albums

Demo albums

Extended plays

Digital extended plays

Singles

As lead artist

As featured artist

Other charting songs

Video albums

Music videos

Other appearances

Notes

References
General

Specific

External links
Death Cab for Cutie official web site
SOUL MEETS BODY - Death Cab for Cutie Italian Forum

Death Cab for Cutie
Discographies of American artists
Rock music group discographies
Alternative rock discographies